Île Verronge is an island in the St. Brandon archipelago in the Indian Ocean. It is one of the outer islands of Mauritius. 

In the 1840s, the primary fishing station of St. Brandon was established on Île Verronge which today is an uninhabited bird and turtle sanctuary. Access to the public is restricted, and permission is required to onboard the island from the local fishing company with established fishing stations on the islands. 

Île Verronge was one of the islands chosen by the World Bank to be part of the marine protected area of St Brandon.

See also
St Brandon
Mascarene Islands
Île Raphael
Avocaré Island
L'île du Sud
L'île du Gouvernement
L'Île Coco

References 

Ile Verronge
Outer Islands of Mauritius
Reefs of the Indian Ocean
Important Bird Areas of Mauritius
Atolls of the Indian Ocean